Knob Noster  is a city in Johnson County, Missouri, United States. The population was 2,709 at the 2010 census. It is located adjacent to and closely associated with Whiteman Air Force Base.  Knob Noster State Park is nearby.

History
Knob Noster was platted in 1856. The community, in the eastern part of Washington Township, was laid out in 1856 by William A. Wortham, and incorporated by act of legislature December 14, 1859. All authorities agree that the name is connected with the prominent mound or knob (or knobs) that stand isolated on the prairie near the town. The second part of the name is said to have been suggested by a school teacher, but its origin is uncertain. Eaton derives it from the Latin, interpreting the whole name as a barbarous mixture signifying "Our Knobs," an etymology which seems unlikely. Further light on the source of the name is needed. The town was removed to its present site when the Pacific Railroad was built. A post office has been in operation in Knob Noster since 1846.

Geography
Knob Noster is located along U.S. Route 50 approximately nine miles east of Warrensburg. Knob Noster State Park lies to the southwest along Missouri Route 23 and Whiteman Air Force Base lies directly south about one mile.

Demographics

2010 census
As of the census of 2010, there were 2,709 people, 1,147 households, and 675 families living in the city. The racial makeup of the city was 80.0% White, 9.1% African American, 0.6% Native American, 3.1% Asian, 0.7% Pacific Islander, 2.2% from other races, and 4.2% from two or more races. Hispanic or Latino of any race were 6.8% of the population.

There were 1,147 households, of which 33.8% had children under the age of 18 living with them, 41.5% were married couples living together, 12.6% had a female householder with no husband present, 4.8% had a male householder with no wife present, and 41.2% were non-families. 31.7% of all households were made up of individuals, and 6.5% had someone living alone who was 65 years of age or older. The average household size was 2.36 and the average family size was 3.03.

The median age in the city was 27.1 years. 25.4% of residents were under the age of 18; 18.4% were between the ages of 18 and 24; 28.3% were from 25 to 44; 20.1% were from 45 to 64; and 7.9% were 65 years of age or older. The gender makeup of the city was 51.6% male and 48.4% female.

2000 census
As of the census of 2000, there were 2,462 people, 959 households, and 602 families living in the city. The population density was 1,421.8 people per square mile (549.5/km2). There were 1,092 housing units at an average density of 630.6 per square mile (243.7/km2). The racial makeup of the city was 71.61% White, 11.86% African American, 0.93% Native American, 1.83% Asian, 0.49% Pacific Islander, 10.32% from other races, and 2.97% from two or more races. Hispanic of any race were 15.07% of the population.

There were 959 households, out of which 33.6% had children under the age of 18 living with them, 44.9% were married couples living together, 13.2% had a female householder with no husband present, and 37.2% were non-families. 28.6% of all households were made up of individuals, and 6.5% had someone living alone who was 65 years of age or older. The average household size was 2.57 and the average family size was 3.14.

In the city, the population was spread out, with 27.6% under the age of 18, 19.3% from 18 to 24, 29.7% from 25 to 44, 16.8% from 45 to 64, and 6.7% who were 65 years of age or older. The median age was 27 years. For every 100 females, there were 110.8 males. For every 100 females age 18 and over, there were 110.5 males.

The median income for a household in the city was $30,869, and the median income for a family was $36,842. Males had a median income of $22,176 versus $19,327 for females. The per capita income for the city was $15,702. About 13.4% of families and 17.0% of the population were below the poverty line, including 28.4% of those under age 18 and 2.0% of those age 65 or over.

Education
Knob Noster R-VIII School District operates two elementary schools, one middle school, and Knob Noster High School. Knob Noster has a public library, a branch of the Trails Regional Library.

In popular culture
Knob Noster was mentioned in the 1983 American television movie The Day After.

References

External links
 City of Knob Noster
Knob Noster Cemetery Association 
 Historic maps of Knob Noster in the Sanborn Maps of Missouri Collection at the University of Missouri

Cities in Johnson County, Missouri
Cities in Missouri